Hugh Francois (14 November 1904 – 17 July 1982) was a South African cricketer. He played in sixteen first-class matches for Border from 1923/24 to 1927/28.

See also
 List of Border representative cricketers

References

External links
 

1904 births
1982 deaths
South African cricketers
Border cricketers